Ducados may refer to:

 Duchy or dukedom and governed by a Duke or Duchess regnant
 A form of currency used in old Spain, a local version of the ducat
 Ducados, a brand of Spanish cigarette produced  by the company Imperial Tobacco following their acquisition of Altadis in January 2008.